The girls' sprint competition of the biathlon events at the 2012 Winter Youth Olympics in Innsbruck, Austria, was held on January 15, at Seefeld Arena. 48 athletes from 27 nations took part in this event. The race was 6 km in length.

Results
The race was started at 13:15.

References

Biathlon at the 2012 Winter Youth Olympics